Celebration of Annihilation was one of five singles Servotron released in 1996. It was released orange vinyl and black vinyl on Eastside Records. "The Computer Wore Tennis Shoes" is about the 1969 Disney film starring Kurt Russell, later remade for TV with Kirk Cameron.

Track listing
Vic 20 Side: "Bad Birthday"
Commodore 64 Side: "The Computer Wore Tennis Shoes"

Intelligent Artificial Subjugators
MACHINE 1: Z4-OBX: Self-replicating synthetic metronome
MACHINE 2: Proto Unit V3: Servo-controlled point to point melodic seduction
MACHINE 3: 00ZX1: Integrated binary guitar data, voice simulation
MACHINE 4: Gammatron: Continuous loop patch 4 low frequency fill out

Other credits
Recorded at Zero Return Sound Factory/Conveyor Belt B-7
All audible frequencies made from Realistic™ Electronic Products
Design/Illustration: Shag

Servotron albums
1996 EPs